Xiazhuangocaris is an extinct genus of bivalved arthropod known from the Cambrian aged Chengjiang Biota of Yunnan, China. The bivalved carpace has a pronounced pair of notches at its front, as well as a posterior notch at its rear. The body had at least 13 tergite-pleurite rings, which terminate in a pair of rounded caudal rami, which are fringed with setae. The describing authors interpreted the taxon as a member of Hymenocarina, which contains other Cambrian bivalved arthropods.

References 

Hymenocarina
Cambrian arthropods